The 22nd Virginia Cavalry Regiment was a cavalry regiment raised in Virginia for service in the Confederate States Army during the American Civil War. It fought mostly in southwestern Virginia, East Tennessee, and the Shenandoah Valley.

Virginia's 22nd Cavalry Regiment completed its organization in October, 1863, and was sometimes called "Bowen's Regiment Virginia Mounted Riflemen," having been raised by Col. Henry S. Bowen, formerly of the 188th (Tazewell County Militia. The unit served in William Lowther Jackson's and John McCausland's Brigade and confronted the Federals in Tennessee, western Virginia (including newly created West Virginia), and the Shenandoah Valley. During April, 1865, it disbanded. The field officers were Colonel Henry S. Bowen, Lieutenant Colonel John T. Radford, and Major Henry F. Kendrick. A Union soldier, Sergeant Levi Shoemaker, was awarded the Medal of Honor for capturing the regiment's flag during an engagement at Nineveh, Warren County, Virginia on November 12, 1864. Two members would later serve one term each in the Virginia General Assembly, John C. Stanfield who would also serve as superintendent of the Washington Alms House before returning to Washington County and serving in the House of Delegates in 1906, and William Orville Moore representing Wythe County in 1912.

Companies and officers

See also

List of Virginia Civil War units

References

Units and formations of the Confederate States Army from Virginia
1863 establishments in Virginia
Military units and formations established in 1863
1865 disestablishments in Virginia
Military units and formations disestablished in 1865